Vietnam competed at the 2008 Summer Olympics in Beijing. It is the 13th summer games in which the nation has competed since its first appearance in 1952. Although it has sent a modest delegation every year it has competed, Vietnam had only earned one Olympic medal before Beijing (in 2000). The Vietnam Olympic Committee sent thirteen athletes to compete in eight of the 28 Olympic sports. It is the largest ever contingent for the nation, up from 11 in the 2004 games.

Medalists

Athletics

Two athletes represented Vietnam in Beijing.

Men

Women

Badminton

Vietnam sent two athletes to compete in two of the five badminton events. Nguyễn Tiến Minh entered ranked 24th in the world, while Lê Ngọc Nguyên Nhung was ranked 72nd.

Gymnastics

Artistic
Đỗ Thị Ngân Thương represented Vietnam in artistic gymnastics, becoming the first Vietnamese gymnast to be selected for Olympic competition. Although she did not qualify individually, she received a wild card invitation from the International Olympic Committee. She competed in the qualification stage, where her 52.1 final score placed her in 59th overall, missing the event and all-around competition finals. On 15 August 2008, Thuong failed a drugs test for furosemide and her result was disqualified. IOC professor Arne Ljungqvist suggested Thuong's drug use was due to "poor information of the athlete", rather than a deliberate attempt to violate the rules.

Women

Shooting

One athlete qualified to compete in two shooting events. Nguyễn Mạnh Tường failed to advance in either the 10 metre or 50 metre pistol events.

Men

Swimming

One athlete qualified to compete in swimming at the Games, finishing 58th and failing to advance.

Men

Table tennis

One athlete competed for Vietnam in the men's table tennis singles tournament. Đoàn Kiến Quốc won his first two matches, but lost in the second round to a Russian opponent.

Taekwondo

Vietnam sent three athletes to compete in three taekwondo events at these Games. The team had an overall record of 1–3, with only Trần Thị Ngọc Trúc managing to win a match. Trần qualified for the repechage after her second round opponent made the final, but could not advance to a bronze medal match.

Weightlifting

Two athletes competed in two weightlifting events at the games. Hoàng Anh Tuấn was ranked fifth in the world in his category and was called Vietnam's best chance at a medal in the Games. This turned out to be an accurate assessment, as he lifted 130 kilograms in the snatch leaving him tied in lift weight for 2nd, but losing a tie on body weight. In the clean and jerk, Hoàng made his first lift at 155 kilos, but missed his second attempt at 160 and fell back to 4th. However, on his final lift he was successful at 160 kilograms, while his opponents in the battle for the silver medal all missed at that weight or selected a lower weight to attempt, moving him into second place by two kilograms. This was just the second Olympic medal in Vietnamese history, and the first in weightlifting.

See also
 Vietnam at the 2008 Summer Paralympics

References

Official 2008 Summer Olympics Results Website

Nations at the 2008 Summer Olympics
2008
Olympics